Maurice is a 1987 British romantic drama film directed by James Ivory, based on the 1971 novel Maurice by E. M. Forster.  The film stars James Wilby as Maurice, Hugh Grant as Clive and Rupert Graves as Alec. The supporting cast includes Denholm Elliott as Dr Barry, Simon Callow as Mr Ducie, Billie Whitelaw as Mrs Hall, and Ben Kingsley as Lasker-Jones.

The film was produced by Ismail Merchant via Merchant Ivory Productions and Film Four International, and written by Ivory and Kit Hesketh-Harvey, with cinematography by Pierre Lhomme. It is a tale of gay love in the restrictive and repressed culture of Edwardian England. The story follows its main character, Maurice Hall, through university, a tumultuous relationship, struggling to fit into society, and ultimately being united with his life partner.

Plot
During a trip to a windswept beach, Maurice Hall, an 11-year-old schoolboy, receives instructions about the "sacred mysteries" of sex from his teacher, who wants to explain to the fatherless boy the changes he would experience in puberty.

Years later, in 1909, Maurice is attending Cambridge, where he strikes up a friendship with two fellow students: the aristocratic Viscount Risley and the rich and handsome Clive Durham. Clive falls in love with his friend and surprises Maurice by confessing his feelings. At first, Maurice reacts with horror, but he soon realizes that he reciprocates Clive's feelings. The two friends embark on a passionate love affair but, at Clive's insistence, their relationship remains non-sexual. To go further, in Clive's opinion, would diminish them both. Clive, a member of the upper class, has a promising future ahead of him and does not want to risk losing his social position. Their close relationship continues after Maurice is expelled from Cambridge and begins a new career as a stockbroker in London.

The two friends keep their feelings secret but are frightened when Lord Risley is arrested and sentenced to six months' hard labour after soliciting sex from a soldier. Clive, afraid of being exposed as a homosexual, breaks with Maurice. After his return from a trip to Greece, Clive, under pressure from his widowed mother, marries a naive rich girl named Anne and settles into a life of rural domesticity.

Heartbroken, Maurice seeks the help of his family physician, Dr. Barry, who dismisses Maurice's doubts as "rubbish". Maurice then turns to Dr. Lasker-Jones, who tries to cure his homosexual longings with hypnosis. During his visits to Clive's estate of Pendersleigh, Maurice attracts the attention of Alec Scudder, the under-gamekeeper who is due to emigrate with his brother to Argentina. Maurice not only fails to notice Scudder's interest in him, but initially treats him with contempt. This does not discourage Scudder, who spies on Maurice at night. Simcox, the butler at Pendersleigh, suspecting the true nature of Maurice and Clive's past relationship, has hinted to Scudder about Maurice's nature. On a rainy night, Scudder boldly climbs a ladder and enters Maurice's bedroom through an open window. Scudder kisses Maurice, who is completely taken by surprise but does not resist his sexual advances.

After their first night together, Maurice receives a letter from Scudder proposing they meet at the Pendersleigh boathouse. Maurice wrongly believes that Scudder is blackmailing him. Maurice returns to Lasker-Jones, who warns Maurice that England is a country which "has always been disinclined to accept human nature" and advises he emigrate to a country where homosexuality is no longer criminalised, like France or Italy. When Maurice fails to appear at the boathouse, Scudder travels to London and visits him at his offices.

Maurice and Scudder meet at the British Museum and the blackmail misunderstanding is resolved. Maurice begins to call Scudder by his first name, Alec. They spend the night together in a hotel room, and as Alec departs in the morning he explains that his departure for Argentina is imminent and they will not see each other again. Maurice goes to the port to give Alec a parting gift only to discover that Alec has missed the sailing. Maurice goes to Pendersleigh and confesses to Clive his love for Alec. Clive, who was hoping that Maurice would marry, is bewildered at Maurice's account of his encounters with Alec. The two friends separate and Maurice goes to the boathouse looking for Alec, who is there waiting for him. Scudder tells him that he sent a telegram to Maurice stating that he was to come to the boathouse. Alec has left his family and abandoned his plans to emigrate in order to stay with Maurice, telling him, "Now we shan't never be parted." Meanwhile, Clive is getting ready for bed and briefly reminisces about his time with Maurice.

Cast

 James Wilby as Maurice Hall
 Hugh Grant as Clive Durham
 Rupert Graves as Alec Scudder
 Denholm Elliott as Doctor Barry
 Simon Callow as Mr. Ducie
 Billie Whitelaw as Mrs. Hall
 Barry Foster as Dean Cornwallis
 Judy Parfitt as Mrs. Durham
 Phoebe Nicholls as Anne Durham
 Ben Kingsley as Lasker-Jones
 Patrick Godfrey as Simcox, Durham's butler

 Mark Tandy as Lord Risley
 Kitty Aldridge as Kitty Hall
 Helena Michell as Ada Hall
 Catherine Rabett as Pippa Durham
 Peter Eyre as Reverend Borenius
 Orlando Wells as Maurice as a boy
 Julian Wadham as Hull
 Richard Warner as Judge
 Helena Bonham Carter as woman at cricket match (uncredited)
 Mark Payton as Chapman
 Matthew Sim as Featherstonhaugh

Production

Background
E. M. Forster wrote Maurice in 1913–14, and revised it in 1932 and again in 1959–1960. Written as a traditional Bildungsroman, or novel of character formation, the plot follows the title character as he deals with the problem of coming of age as a homosexual in the restrictive society of the Edwardian era. Forster, who had based his characters on real people, was keen that his novel should have a happy ending. The author did not intend to publish the novel while his mother was alive, but he showed the manuscript to selected friends, such as Christopher Isherwood. Forster resisted publication during his lifetime because of public and legal attitudes to homosexuality. He was also ambivalent about the literary merits of his novel. A note found on the manuscript read: "Publishable, but worth it?" The novel was only published in 1971 after Forster's death. It is considered one of his minor works, in comparison with his novels Howards End (1910) and A Passage to India (1924).

James Ivory was interested in making a screen adaptation after the critical and box office success he achieved with another of Forster's novels, A Room with a View. While involved in this earlier project Ivory had read all of Forster's books, and eventually came to Maurice. "I thought," Ivory said, "that it was interesting material and would be enjoyable to make – and also something we could make in that it wouldn't require too much organization and wouldn't cost all that much." The situation it explores seemed to him to be still relevant: "People's turmoil and having to decide for themselves how they want to live and what their true feelings are and whether they're going to live honestly with them or deny them. That's no different. Nothing's any easier, for young people. I felt it was quite relevant."

In his will, Forster left the rights to his books to King's College, Cambridge, which has a self-governing board of fellows of the college. They were initially reluctant to give permission to film Maurice, not because of the subject matter of the novel, but because it was considered an inferior work, and a film that called attention to it would not enhance Forster's literary reputation. Ismail Merchant, the producer of the film, conferred with them and was very persuasive. They were favourably impressed with the adaptation by  Merchant Ivory Productions of A Room with a View and relented.

Writing
Ivory's usual writing partner, Ruth Prawer Jhabvala, was unavailable because she was busy writing her novel Three Continents. Ivory wrote the screenplay with Kit Hesketh-Harvey, who had become connected with Merchant Ivory Productions through his sister, journalist and author Sarah Sands (born Sarah Harvey), who was then the wife of Julian Sands, the leading man in A Room with a View. Hesketh-Harvey had previously written documentaries for the BBC. He had attended Tonbridge School and Cambridge University, where Forster was educated, and knew the background. Ivory later said, "What Kit brought to the script was his social background. He went to Cambridge and a fancy prep school. His knowledge of the British upper middle class, that was incredibly useful – the dialect, the speech, the slang, and so many other things. As an American, I could not have possibly written the script without him."

Jhabvala reviewed the script and suggested changes. On her advice, Clive Durham's unconvincing conversion to heterosexuality during a trip to Greece was justified by creating an episode in which Clive's university friend Risley is arrested and imprisoned after a homosexual entrapment, which frightens Clive into marrying.

Casting
Julian Sands, who had played the male lead in Merchant Ivory's A Room with a View, was originally cast in the title role, but backed out at the last minute. John Malkovich was due to take the role of Lasker-Jones. He had become a friend of Julian Sands while both were making The Killing Fields. After Sands left the project Malkovich lost interest in the film and was replaced by Ben Kingsley.

James Wilby had auditioned for the role of Clive Durham's brother-in-law. When Sands left the project, Ivory considered two unknown actors for the role of Maurice: James Wilby and Julian Wadham. Since he had already cast the dark-haired Hugh Grant as Clive, Ivory decided on the blond James Wilby over the dark-haired Julian Wadham, who was given a role as one of Maurice's stockbroker friends.

Hugh Grant, who later found international stardom with Four Weddings and a Funeral, had previously appeared in only one film, Privileged. He was doing review comedy at the time and had lost interest in professional acting when Celestia Fox, the casting director, sent Grant to Ivory who immediately gave him the role of Clive. It helped that Grant and Wilby had worked together in Grant's first film, made at Oxford. Rupert Graves was cast as Alec Scudder, Maurice's working-class lover. He had appeared as Lucy Honeychurch's young brother in A Room with a View, a performance with which he was unsatisfied, and so he appreciated the opportunity to deliver a better performance.

The supporting cast included veterans Denholm Elliott as Dr. Barry and Simon Callow as the pedagogue Mr. Ducie, both from A Room with a View; Ben Kingsley as Lasker-Jones; Patrick Godfrey as the butler Simcox; Billie Whitelaw as Maurice's mother; and Helena Bonham Carter in an uncredited cameo as an audience member at the cricket match.

Filming
The film was made on a budget of £1.58 million that included investment by Cinecom and Britain's Channel 4. Maurice proved more complicated to make than Ivory had anticipated. Its fifty-four-day shooting schedule, which involved working six-day weeks, proved long and grueling. There was no rehearsal period, only a read-through before shooting began.

Maurice was shot on location largely in the halls and quadrangles of King's College, Cambridge including interiors in the college's chapel, where Forster was educated and later returned as a Fellow. The other interiors were primarily shot at Wilbury Park, a Palladian house in Wiltshire. Its owner, Maria St. Just, an actress and trustee of the estate of Tennessee Williams, was a friend of Merchant and Ivory. In 1979 they had been weekend guests at Wilbury Park, which made an impression on James Ivory, who, when Maurice was being prepared, chose it to serve as Pendersleigh, the country house where Maurice visits his friend Clive.

In the style of Merchant Ivory's A Room with a View, old book endpapers accompany the theme music played in minor scale at the beginning and in major scale at the end to bracket the film as a cinematographic novel.

Differences from the novel
At the beginning of the film, Maurice is 11, rather than 14. The film omits almost all of the novel's philosophical dialogue and many subplots, such as Maurice's desire for the schoolboy Dickie. The scenes dealing with the subplot were filmed but not included in the final cut.

The film expands the Wildean character of Lord Risley and sees him sentenced to six months of hard labour for homosexual conduct; in the novel, he is never imprisoned. In one deleted scene (first released in Cohen Media's 2002 DVD edition), Risley commits suicide.

In the novel, the Durham family seat is Penge, on the border of Wiltshire and Somerset; in the film, the country house is in Pendersleigh Park.

The hypnotist Lasker-Jones appears in the film rather more than in the novel; he is the person most understanding of Maurice's psychological and social situation.

Release
The film had its world premiere at the Venice Film Festival in 1987, where Ivory was awarded a Silver Lion as Best Director, sharing the prize with Ermanno Olmi. James Wilby and Hugh Grant were jointly awarded Best Actor, and Richard Robbins received the prize for his music. The film received favourable reviews when it opened in New York City. Maurice received an Academy Award nomination in the Best Costume Design category.

Critical reception
Review aggregator Rotten Tomatoes reports that 82% of critics gave the film a positive review based on 33 reviews; the critics' consensus reads, "Maurice sensitively explores the ramifications of forbidden desire with a powerful love story brought to life by the outstanding efforts of a talented cast." Ken Hanke from Mountain Xpress said it was probably Merchant–Ivory's best film.

In The New York Times Janet Maslin observed "The novel's focus is predominantly on the inner life of the title character, but the film, while faithful, is broader. Moving slowly, with a fine eye for detail, it presents the forces that shape Maurice as skillfully as it brings the character to life."

Roger Ebert of the Chicago Sun-Times rated the film three stars out of a possible four, commenting:

Claire Tomalin writing for Sight & Sound called the film "subtle, intelligent, moving and absorbing [...] extraordinary in the way it mixes fear and pleasure, horror and love, it's a stunning success for a team who seems to have mastered all the problems of making literary films".

Judy Stone in the San Francisco Chronicle wrote: "To director James Ivory's credit, however, he has recreated that period in pre-World War I England and endowed the platonic passion between two upper-class Englishmen with singular grace in Maurice." Michael Blowen in The Boston Globe commented: "The team of producer Ismail Merchant and director James Ivory has created another classy film of a classic novel with their stunning adaptation of E. M. Forster's Maurice."

Reception in the UK was different, with The Times questioning whether "so defiant a salute to homosexual passion should really be welcomed during a spiraling AIDS crisis". James Ivory has attributed the negative reviews to the reviewers being homosexual themselves, stating:

Legacy
Maurice has won abundant praise in the 30 years since its initial release, both for the quality of the film and the audacity with which it depicted a gay love story at the height of the 1980s AIDS crisis. According to the Los Angeles Times, the fact that: 

The New Yorker, in a retrospective on the film in 2017, stated, "...For many gay men coming of age in the eighties and nineties, 'Maurice' was revelatory: a first glimpse, onscreen or anywhere, of what love between men could look like". Director James Ivory said, "So many people have come up to me since 'Maurice' and pulled me aside and said, 'I just want you to know you changed my life.'"

The Guardian, describing Maurice as "undervalued in 1987 and underseen in 2017", lamented the relatively poor reception of the film compared to its lauded predecessor A Room with a View, saying it was "...filed away as, if not a disappointment, a lesser diversion" because it was "put bluntly, too gay". LA Weekly likewise called Maurice "the Merchant-Ivory film the World Missed", stating that: "it seems like it’s only recently been celebrated for how groundbreaking it was, and for its importance in the development of gay cinema."

In May 2017, a 4K restoration of Maurice was given a limited release in the United States to celebrate the film's 30th anniversary. In March 2018, the restored version was screened in London as part of the BFI Flare: London LGBT Film Festival, with introductions by James Wilby and Hugh Grant.

Home media
In 2002, a special-edition DVD of the film was released with a new documentary and deleted scenes with director's commentary. It was released on Blu-ray in September 2017 by the Cohen Media Group.

Awards
Venice Film Festival
 1987 Won, Best Actor for James Wilby & Hugh Grant
 1987 Won, Silver Lion (Best Director) for James Ivory
 1987 Won, Golden Osella (Best Music) for Richard Robbins

Academy Awards
 1988 Nominated, Best Costume Design (Jenny Beavan, John Bright)

See also
 List of lesbian, gay, bisexual, or transgender-related films by storyline

References

Sources
 Long, Robert Emmet. The Films of Merchant Ivory. Citadel Press. 1993, 
 Long, Robert Emmet. James Ivory in Conversation. University of California Press, 2005, .

External links
 
 
 
 
 Maurice at Merchant Ivory Productions

1987 films
1987 LGBT-related films
1987 romantic drama films
1980s coming-of-age drama films
1980s English-language films
1980s historical drama films
1980s historical romance films
Bloomsbury Group in LGBT history
British coming-of-age drama films
British historical drama films
British historical romance films
British LGBT-related films
British romantic drama films
Coming-of-age romance films
E. M. Forster in performing arts
Film4 Productions films
Films about conversion therapy
Films based on British novels
Films directed by James Ivory
Films about hypnosis
Films set in the 1900s
Films set in the 1910s
Films set in country houses
Films set in museums
Films shot in Cambridgeshire
Films shot in Dorset
Films shot in East Sussex
Films shot in Gloucestershire
Films shot in Italy
Films shot in London
Films shot in Surrey
Films shot in Wiltshire
Films with screenplays by James Ivory
Gay-related films
LGBT-related coming-of-age films
LGBT-related romantic drama films
Merchant Ivory Productions films
1980s British films